Laxmi Narayan is a 1951 Hindu mythological film directed by Nanabhai Bhatt starring Meena Kumari and Mahipal in lead roles.
Meena Kumari, after her career as a child artist, started doing adult roles as heroines in mythological and fantasy films before she made it in mainstream cinema with Baiju Bawra (1952).

Cast

Male Cast
Mahipal as Narayan
S. N. Tripathi
Babu Raje
Dalpat
Shribhagwan
Banke Bihari

Male cast (continued)
Brijmohan Vyas
Amarnath
Agha Shapur
Gadadhar Sharma
Kamal Kumar
Korega
Vasantrao Pahalwan

Female Cast
Meena Kumari as Laxmi
Kanta Kumari
Urmila
Leela Kumari
Chandni
Lalita Rao
Sulochana

References

External links
 

1951 films
1950s Hindi-language films
Indian black-and-white films
Hindu mythological films
Films scored by S. N. Tripathi